Edderton railway station served the village of Edderton, Highland, Scotland from 1864 to 1960 on the Inverness and Ross-shire Railway.

History 
The station opened on 1 October 1864 by the Inverness and Aberdeen Junction Railway. The station closed to both passengers and goods traffic on 13 June 1960.

The former station building, now a private residence, can be seen on the approach to the Balblair distillery.

References

External links 

Disused railway stations in Ross and Cromarty
Former Highland Railway stations
Railway stations in Great Britain opened in 1864
Railway stations in Great Britain closed in 1960
1864 establishments in Scotland
1960 disestablishments in Scotland